The 1933–34 Palestine League was the second season of league football in the British Mandate for Palestine. The defending champions, British Police didn't take part in this season following an order by the High Commissioner forbidding British teams to play Jewish teams.

The season was played between November 1933 and April 1934. Five matches remained to be played, but were never completed. The championship was won by Hapoel Tel Aviv, who finished the season unbeaten.

League table

References
RSSSF
100 Years of Football 1906-2006, Elisha Shohat (Israel), 2006
On Mistakes and Omissions In the 1933-34 Palestine League Table Eran Rabl  

Palestine League seasons
Palestine
1933–34 in Mandatory Palestine football
Football
Football